Soccerstar is the debut EP by the New Zealand punk band Steriogram, released through Capitol Records on November 11, 1999. The EP is considered to be the first mini-album of a series, but this has not been confirmed. Steriogram announced that their next EP would be released in early 2001. The album is not commonly remembered and most of the songs can be bought on unknown websites. A music video was made for the single "Soccerstar".

Track listing
 "Chiqboom" – 03:51 
 "Soccerstar" – 03:50
 "Aeroplane" – 03:57

Personnel
 Brad Carter - lead vocals, lead guitar
 Tim Youngson - rhythm guitar, backing vocals
 Jake Adams - bass guitar, backing vocals
 Tyson Kennedy - drums, backing vocals

References

Steriogram EPs
1999 debut EPs